Madoka is both a feminine Japanese given name and a Japanese surname.

Possible writings
Madoka can be written using different kanji characters and can mean:

as a given name
円, "circle"
円花, "circle, flower"
窓香, "window, incense/aroma" 
as a surname
円, "circle"

The name can also be written in hiragana or katakana.

People with the given name
, Japanese professional wrestler
, Japanese voice actress
, Japanese women's footballer
, Japanese luger
, Japanese voice actress and singer
, Japanese shogi player
, Japanese long-distance runner
, Japanese cross-country skier
, Japanese ballet dancer
, Japanese voice actress and singer
, a Japanese rock star and guitarist for the band Unsraw

People with the surname
, Japanese politician

Fictional characters
with the given name Madoka
, a character in the manga series Flame of Recca
Madoka, a character in the video games TwinBee and Otomedius
, a character in the anime series Aikatsu!
, a character in the anime series Beyblade: Metal Fusion
, a character in the manga series Kimagure Orange Road
, a character in the manga series Angelic Layer
, a character in the anime series Star Twinkle PreCure
, the title character of the anime series Puella Magi Madoka Magica
, a character in the video game Tokimeki Memorial Girl's Side
, protagonist of the anime series Lagrange: The Flower of Rin-ne
, a character in the manga and anime series Negima!
, a character in the anime series Devil Hunter Yohko
, a character in the manga series Tenjho Tenge
, a character in the manga series Spiral: The Bonds of Reasoning
, a character in the light novel series Infinite Stratos
, a character in the video game Fatal Frame IV
, a character in the manga series Full Moon o Sagashite

with the surname Madoka
, a character in the anime series DokiDoki! PreCure
, a character in the tokusatsu series Ultraman Tiga
, a character in the manga series Gilgamesh
, a character in the manga series Gilgamesh
, a character in the manga series Gilgamesh

Japanese feminine given names
Japanese-language surnames